Rodolfo "Rudy" Sandoval (born 25 January 1937 in Guaymas, Sonora, México) played professional baseball from 1953 to 1976 and from 1979 to 1980, including 24 seasons in the Mexican League, the highest level of professional baseball in Mexico. He also managed in the league for eight seasons. He was elected to the Mexican Professional Baseball Hall of Fame in 2001.

References

External links

1937 births
Living people
Mexican Baseball Hall of Fame inductees
Mexican baseball players
Mexican League baseball managers
Minor league baseball managers
Minor league baseball players